Andrey Alexandrovich Kuznetsov (born 22 February 1991) is an inactive Russian professional tennis player. On 25 April 2016, he achieved his singles career-high of world No. 39.

Kuznetsov won the Boys' Singles title at the 2009 Wimbledon Championships.

Career

Early life
Andrey Kuznestov started playing tennis at age six, coached by his father Alexander. In 2001, his family moved to Balashikha, attending the sports club there. His father resumed coaching Andrey and his elder brother Alexey.

According to some mass media reports, Andrey allegedly had problems with his back since his childhood, so he attended manual therapies. But Andrey's coach and father declined it, stating he had problems with his hip and the therapy could be described as tough fitness.

2006–09: Grand Slam Junior title
Kuznetsov played his first ITF junior tournament at the 2006 Black Gold of Udmurtia, but received a walkover in the qualifying round. His first notable achievement was at the Governor Cup in St. Petersburg, reaching the semi-finals there. He reached his first final at the NBU Cup in Uzbekistan. Most of the tournaments were on a clay court, but in 2007 he played on carpet and hard. In this season he reached three finals in singles, winning once, and three doubles finals in doubles, winning twice. His best season was in 2008, when he won three singles titles and played well in doubles. Andrey's last junior tournament became the 2009 Wimbledon, winning his first Grand Slam title. For the first time in 43 years a Russian won the Wimbledon since Soviet Vladimir Korotkov achieved that feat in 1965 and 1966.

As a junior Kuznetsov posted an 80–24 win–loss record in singles, reaching a combined ranking of No. 3 in the world in July 2009.

2010–15: Grand Slam debut, Top 100, first Grand Slam and first top-10 win
He made his first main draw Grand Slam appearance at the 2010 Wimbledon Championships where he lost in five sets to the 31st seed Romanian Victor Hănescu.

He defeated the 11th seed of the 2013 Australian Open, Juan Mónaco in straight sets in the first round to reach the second round of a Grand Slam for the first time.

At Wimbledon in 2014, Kuznetsov recorded his first win over a player ranked inside the world's top-10 by defeating seventh seed David Ferrer in five sets. The win also took Kuznetsov to the third round of a Grand Slam for the first time.

At the 2014 US Open, he defeated Fernando Verdasco in the second round, but lost to Andy Murray in the third round.

At the 2015 Australian Open, he got into the second round, but lost to the top seed Novak Djokovic.

2016: Russian No. 1, second top-10 win

Andrey debuted in 2016 at the Qatar Open, losing in the quarterfinals to Rafael Nadal in three tight sets. At the 2016 Australian Open, he got his best ever result in a grand slam, beating Dudi Sela to make it to the fourth round. In the following tournaments he got beyond the first rounds. Reaching the second round of the Miami Open, Kuznetsov became Russia's new number one male tennis player, replacing Teymuraz Gabashvili, who lost in Miami in the first round. Kuznetsov in the second round defeated 4th-seeded Stan Wawrinka, the second time he won against a top-10 player. He then beat Adrian Mannarino in the third round 2–6, 7–5, 6–0. In the fourth round he lost to Nick Kyrgios 6–7, 3–6.

Kuznetsov debuted at the Olympic Games. In the first round he retired before the start of the third set of the match against Roberto Bautista Agut because of injury.

2017: First 3 ATP singles semifinals and first doubles final

After a first round loss to fifth seed Jo-Wilfried Tsonga in Doha, Kuznetsov made his maiden ATP semifinal appearance in Sydney where he fell to fellow first time semifinalist Dan Evans in another three setter. In the first round of the Australian Open, he pushed fifth seed Kei Nishikori to five sets. In the first round of the Davis Cup World Group, he teamed up with Konstantin Kravchuk in Russia's doubles rubber against Serbia but they lost in four sets to Viktor Troicki and Nenad Zimonjić. A week later, he lost to Troicki and Zimonjić again, this time in the doubles final of the Garanti Koza Sofia Open. He ended a three match losing streak at the Miami Open where he reached the second round.

Kuznetsov began his clay season in Monte Carlo where he qualified for the main draw following wins over established players Julien Benneteau and Mikhail Youzhny. He then lost to the ninth seed Tomas Berdych after taking the first set. He reached his second quarterfinal of the year at the inaugural Hungarian Open where he upset the third seed Fabio Fognini en route. After a three set first round loss to Tsonga at the Mutua Madrid Open, Kuznetsov advanced to his second ATP semifinal in singles at the Geneva Open where he fell to world No. 3 and defending champion Stan Wawrinka in straight sets. At the French Open, he took a set off world No. 1 Andy Murray in the first round. In the SkiStar Swedish Open he made it to his third career semifinal, also his third semifinal this year. He first beat German tennis player Jan-Lennard Struff in only 2 sets. He then defeated no.1 seed, Pablo Carreño Busta, after Carreño Busta retired in the third set. He then beat 7th seed Diego Schwartzman in the quarterfinals in straight sets to eventually lose to Alexandr Dolgopolov in the semifinals.

2018–2019: Hiatus and coaching career
Kuznetsov's only tournament of 2018 was when he participated in the Koblenz Challenger, taking place in January and lost his first round match against alternate player Ilya Ivashka.

In 2019, he was announced as the coach of Russian tennis player Evgeny Donskoy.

2020–2022: Comeback, Challenger title and French Open qualification
Kuznetsov returned on court at the 2020 US Open after nearly three years absence. He received a protected ranking and won his first round match against Sam Querrey in straight sets but lost in the next round to 11th seed Karen Khachanov in straight sets.

Kuznetsov won his first challenger title in close to six years at the 2021 President's Cup II defeating Jason Kubler in the final.

He qualified for the 2022 French Open for his Grand Slam main draw participation in two years and in five years at this Major.

Playing style
Kuznetsov is an aggressive baseliner. He likes to hit it very hard and especially cross-court. While his forehand used to be somewhat of a weakness, it has now developed into a competent shot which he can use as a weapon. On the other hand, his main weakness is his second serve.

Patrick Mouratoglou in 2011 noted his flat shots, nice serve and volley play and a great forehand, but also felt his shot placement and movement should be improved.

Personal life
On 30 June 2018, Kuznetsov married Darya Levchenko, a TV show presenter on Match TV.

ATP career finals

Doubles: 1 (1 runner-up)

Junior significant finals

Junior Grand Slam finals

Singles: 1 (1 title)

Other finals

Universiade medal matches

Mixed Doubles: 1 (1 gold medal)

Futures and Challenger finals

Singles: 24 (15 titles, 9 runner-ups)

Doubles: 19 (9 titles, 10 runner-ups)

Singles performance timeline

Current through the 2022 Australian Open.

Davis Cup

Participations: (8–1)

   indicates the outcome of the Davis Cup match followed by the score, date, place of event, the zonal classification and its phase, and the court surface.

Wins over top 10 players

References

External links

 
 

1991 births
Living people
Sportspeople from Tula, Russia
Russian male tennis players
Wimbledon junior champions
Tennis players at the 2016 Summer Olympics
Olympic tennis players of Russia
Universiade medalists in tennis
Universiade gold medalists for Russia
Grand Slam (tennis) champions in boys' singles
Medalists at the 2013 Summer Universiade